Francesco Lo Celso (born 5 March 2000) is an Argentine professional footballer who plays as a midfielder for Rosario Central.

Career
Lo Celso is a youth academy product of Rosario Central. He was also part of Paris Saint-Germain youth team for few months. He made his professional debut on 1 March 2020, coming on as a 79th minute substitute for Diego Zabala in a 3–1 league win against Arsenal Sarandí.

Lo Celso is an Argentine youth international and was part of under-20 team which finished as runners-up at 2019 South American U-20 Championship.

Personal life
Lo Celso is of Italian heritage. His elder brother Giovani is also a professional footballer and plays for La Liga club Villarreal and the Argentina national team.

References

2000 births
Living people
Argentine people of Italian descent
Footballers from Rosario, Santa Fe
Argentine footballers
Association football midfielders
Rosario Central footballers
Argentine Primera División players